"Marta tiene un marcapasos" (Spanish for Marta has a pacemaker) is the first single released by the Spanish rock band Hombres G for their sophomore studio album La cagaste... Burt Lancaster released through the music label Producciones Twins in 1986.

The song reached the top position on the Spanish singles chart in June 1986. Also received a significant amount of succes again when in mid 2022 the song went viral on TikTok Spain.

This was the second version released of the song, the first appearing on the 1983 single "Marta tiene un marcapasos / La cagaste, Burt Lancaster".  The single's b-side, "Tomasa me persigue" has not been included on any subsequent release.

Track listing
Marta tiene un marcapasos 

Marta tiene un marcapasos - 2:14
Tomasa me persigue - 3:42

Chart history

Personnel
Hombres G

 David Summers - lead vocals, bass
 Rafa Gutierrez - guitar
 Daniel Mezquita - guitar
 Javier Molina - drums

References

External links
 Official website
 Discography
 Hombres G: Albums, Songs, Bios, Photos at Amazon.com

1986 singles
Hombres G songs